Rubus quaesitus is a rare North American species of brambles in the rose family. It has been found in the States of Minnesota and Wisconsin in the north-central United States, plus isolated populations in the Province of New Brunswick in eastern Canada.

The genetics of Rubus is extremely complex, so that it is difficult to decide on which groups should be recognized as species. There are many rare species with limited ranges such as this. Further study is suggested to clarify the taxonomy.

References

quaesitus
Plants described in 1944
Flora of Minnesota
Flora of New Brunswick
Flora of Wisconsin
Flora without expected TNC conservation status